The 2016–17 Premier League International Cup was the third season of the Premier League International Cup, a European club football competition organised by the Premier League for under-23 players.

Villarreal were the defending champions, having defeated PSV 4–2 in the previous season's final, but were eliminated in the group stage.

Qualification
Twelve teams in Premier League 2 were invited to represent England in the tournament, while European teams that qualify for the knockout stages were guaranteed an invite for the following season's competition. The teams were split into six groups of four - with two English league clubs per group. The group winners, and two best runners-up, progressed into the knockout phase of the tournament. The knockout matches were single leg fixtures.

All matches - including fixtures between non-English teams - were played in England and Wales.

Teams
Valencia, Feyenoord, Sparta Prague, Dinamo Zagreb, VfL Wolfsburg, and Hertha Berlin were the new international entrants in the 2016–17 season.

English league system:
 Middlesbrough
 Derby County
 Everton
 Leicester City
 Liverpool
 Manchester United
 Chelsea
 Reading
 Sunderland
 Norwich City
 Aston Villa
 Swansea City

Other countries:
 Valencia
 Athletic Bilbao
 Villarreal
 VfL Wolfsburg
 Hertha Berlin
 Porto
 Benfica
 PSV Eindhoven
 Feyenoord
 Celtic
 Dinamo Zagreb
 Sparta Prague

Group stage
The draw for the group stage was held on 28 July 2016. The teams were drawn into four groups, each containing two English sides and two European sides.

Group A

Group B

Group C

Group D

Group E

Group F

Ranking of second-placed teams

Knockout stages

Quarter-finals

Semi-finals

Final

References

2016-17
International Cup
2016–17 in European football
2016–17 in English football